Music for Pleasure may refer to:

Music for Pleasure (record label), a United Kingdom record label that issued budget-priced albums
Music for Pleasure (band), a new wave band from Leeds, England
Music for Pleasure (The Damned album), the second album by punk rock band The Damned
Music for Pleasure (Monaco album), the first album by synthpop band Monaco
Late Night Tales: Music For Pleasure, a DJ mix album by Tom Findlay
a classical music radio program presented by John Cargher in Australia